Brockley is a district of London, England.

Brockley may also refer to:

 Brockley, Somerset, England
 Brockley, Suffolk, England
 Brockley railway station, London, England
 Brockley Whins, Tyne and Wear, England

See also
 Broccoli (disambiguation)